This article shows the rosters of all participating teams at the 2017 FIVB Volleyball Men's U21 World Championship in Czech Republic.

Argentina

The following is the Argentine roster in the 2017 FIVB Volleyball Men's U21 World Championship.

Head coach: Alejandro Grossi

Brazil

The following is the Brazilian roster in the 2017 FIVB Volleyball Men's U21 World Championship.

Head coach: Tambeiro Nery Pereira Jr.

Canada

The following is the Canadian roster in the 2017 FIVB Volleyball Men's U21 World Championship.

Head coach: Gino Brousseau

China

The following is the Chinese roster in the 2017 FIVB Volleyball Men's U21 World Championship.

Head coach: Ju Genyin

Cuba

The following is the Cuban roster in the 2017 FIVB Volleyball Men's U21 World Championship.

Head coach: Nicolas Vives Coffigny

Czech Republic

The following is the Czech roster in the 2017 FIVB Volleyball Men's U21 World Championship.

Head coach: Ivan Pelikan

Egypt

The following is the Egyptian roster in the 2017 FIVB Volleyball Men's U21 World Championship.

Head coach: Maged Mohamed Mostafa

Iran

The following is the Iranian roster in the 2017 FIVB Volleyball Men's U21 World Championship.

Head coach: Ataei Nouri Behrouz

Italy

The following is the Italian roster in the 2017 FIVB Volleyball Men's U21 World Championship.

Head coach: Michele Totire

Japan

The following is the Japanese roster in the 2017 FIVB Volleyball Men's U21 World Championship.

Head coach: Tokunaga Fumitoshi

Morocco

The following is the Moroccan roster in the 2017 FIVB Volleyball Men's U21 World Championship.

Head coach: Abdellaoui Maan Mohammed

Poland

The following is the Polish roster in the 2017 FIVB Volleyball Men's U21 World Championship.

Head coach: Sebastian Pawlik

Russia

The following is the Russian roster in the 2017 FIVB Volleyball Men's U21 World Championship.

Head coach: Vladimir Khromenkov

Turkey

The following is the Turkish roster in the 2017 FIVB Volleyball Men's U21 World Championship.

Head coach: Ali Kazım Hidayetoğlu

Ukraine

The following is the Ukrainian roster in the 2017 FIVB Volleyball Men's U21 World Championship.

Head coach: Mykola Pasazhin

United States

The following is the American roster in the 2017 FIVB Volleyball Men's U21 World Championship.

Head coach: Jay Hosack

References

External links
 Official website

FIVB Volleyball Men's U21 World Championship
FIVB Men's U21 World Championship
FIVB Volleyball World Championship squads